The 1973 Georgia Bulldogs football team represented the Georgia Bulldogs of the University of Georgia during the 1973 NCAA Division I football season.

Schedule

Source: 1974 Georgia Bulldogs Football Media Guide/Yearbook

Roster

Game summaries

Clemson

Tennessee

    
    
    
    
    
    
    
    
    
    

Andy Johnson scored the game-winning touchdown in the final minute after Tennessee went for it on a fourth-and-two at their own 28 with 2:32 remaining.

References

Georgia
Georgia Bulldogs football seasons
Peach Bowl champion seasons
Georgia Bulldogs football